Nicorps is a commune in the Manche department in Normandy in north-western France.

Notable people
 

Jean-Pierre-François Guillot-Duhamel (1730–1816), engineer

See also
Communes of the Manche department

References

Communes of Manche